Helcogrammoides chilensis is a species of triplefin blenny in the genus Helcogrammoides. It was described by C. Cancino in 1960. It is found on the western coast of South America from Chilean Patagonia to the vicinity of Lima, Peru.

References

chilensis
Fish described in 1960